Cyrano de Bergerac is a 1990 French period comedy-drama film directed by Jean-Paul Rappeneau and based on the 1897 play of the same name by Edmond Rostand, adapted by Jean-Claude Carrière and Rappeneau. It stars Gérard Depardieu, Anne Brochet and Vincent Perez. The film was a co-production between companies in France and Hungary.

The film is the first feature film version of Rostand's original play in colour, and the second theatrical film version of the play in the original French. It is also considerably more lavish and more faithful to the original than previous film versions of the play. The film had 4,732,136 admissions in France.

The film and the performance of Gérard Depardieu won numerous awards, notably 10 of the César Awards of 1991.

Subtitles are used for the non-French market; the English-language version uses Anthony Burgess's translation of the text, which uses five-beat lines with a varying number of syllables and a regular couplet rhyming scheme, in other words, a sprung rhythm. Although he sustains the five-beat rhythm through most of the play, Burgess sometimes allows this structure to break deliberately: in Act V, he allows it to collapse completely, creating free verse.

In 2010, Cyrano de Bergerac was ranked number 43 in Empire magazine's "The 100 Best Films Of World Cinema".

Plot
Gascon poet and swashbuckler Cyrano de Bergerac is self-conscious about his enormous nose, but pretends to be proud of it. He is admired and respected by many people for his bravery and good swordsmanship. He madly loves his cousin, the beautiful Roxane; however, he is sure that she will reject him because of his appearance. To elevate himself in her eyes, he interferes with a play being staged at the Hôtel du Bourgogne, in Paris, and wins a duel with a marquis.

In the second act of the play and film, Cyrano meets with Roxane at her request. He is crushed when Roxane tells him she is infatuated with Christian de Neuvillette, a handsome and dashing new recruit to the Cadets de Gascogne (the military unit in which Cyrano is serving). However, Cyrano learns that Christian is tongue-tied when speaking with women. Seeing an opportunity to vicariously declare his love to Roxane, Cyrano approaches Christian with a proposal: Cyrano will write the love letters, and Christian will woo Roxane with them. Christian agrees.

Cyrano aids Christian, writing heartfelt love letters and poems. Roxane begins to appreciate Christian, not only for his good looks but also his apparent eloquence. She eventually falls in love with him. But the Comte de Guiche, an arrogant and exceptionally powerful older nobleman, also has designs on Roxane. Roxane and Cyrano thwart De Guiche's attempt to visit Roxane by arranging a quick secret marriage between Roxane and Christian. In revenge, De Guiche orders his company of cadets—including Cyrano and Christian—to report immediately for military duty in the Siege of Arras against the Spanish.

The siege is harsh and brutal: the Cadets de Gascogne are starving. Christian does not know that Cyrano escapes over enemy lines twice each day to deliver a love letter written by Cyrano himself but signed with Christian's name, sent to Roxane. These letters draw Roxane out from the city of Paris to the war front. Although she has come to visit Christian, she admits to him that she has fallen in love with the author's soul, and would love the author even if he were ugly. Christian tries to find out whether Roxane loves him or Cyrano, and asks Cyrano to find out. However, during the subsequent battle, Christian is mortally wounded. The scene ends with the French returning to the battle.

In the final scene of the play and film, fourteen years later, Roxane has entered a convent and retired from the world. Cyrano has made many enemies with his writings; he is still free, but now poor. During this time, Cyrano has faithfully visited Roxane every week, never declaring his love. On this day, his enemies attack and mortally injure him. Cyrano nevertheless visits Roxane at the convent. When she mentions Christian's last letter, sensing his own mortality, Cyrano asks if he can read it. Roxane gives him the letter, which he reads movingly. Just before Cyrano dies, Roxane realizes that she has loved him all along.

Cast

 Gérard Depardieu as Cyrano de Bergerac
 Anne Brochet as Roxane
 Vincent Perez as Christian de Neuvillette
 Jacques Weber as Comte Antoine de Guiche
 Roland Bertin as Ragueneau
 Philippe Morier-Genoud as Le Bret
 Pierre Maguelon as Carbon de Castle-Jaloux
 Sandrine Kiberlain as Sister Colette

 Josiane Stoléru as the Duenna
 Philippe Volter as Vicomte de Valvert
 Jean-Marie Winling as Lignière
 Louis Navarre as The Bore
 Gabriel Monnet as Montfleury
 François Marié as Bellerose
 Anatole Delalande as The child
 Alain Rimoux as The father
 Michel Fau as Ragueneau's Poet

Reception
The site's critical consensus reads, "Love and hope soar in Cyrano De Bergerac, an immensely entertaining romance featuring Gerard Depardieu at his peak." On Metacritic, the film has a score of 79 based on 19 reviews, indicating "generally favorable reviews".

Roger Ebert from the Chicago Sun Times awarded the film three out of four stars. In his review on the film, Ebert wrote, "Cyrano de Bergerac is a splendid movie not just because it tells its romantic story, and makes it visually delightful, and centers it on Depardieu, but for a better reason: The movie acts as if it believes this story. Depardieu is not a satirist - not here, anyway. He plays Cyrano on the level, for keeps."
Author and film critic Leonard Maltin awarded the film three and a half out of four stars, calling it "the definitive screen version of the Edmond Rostand perennial". In his review, Maltin praised the film's staging of scenes, while also noting that the film somewhat faltered during the finale by being overextended.

Accolades
The film was nominated for five Academy Awards at the 1990 ceremony, this marked the second time that an actor had been nominated for Best Actor for his portrayal of Cyrano de Bergerac (the first time was in 1950, when José Ferrer won the award for his performance in the English-language version of the film).

Home media
Cyrano de Bergerac was released on DVD by Umbrella Entertainment in May 2005 as part of a collection with the 1950 version. The DVD is compatible with all region codes and includes special features such as the theatrical trailer, Umbrella Entertainment trailers, talent biographies, an interview with Gérard Depardieu and a Roger Ebert review. In February 2009 an Academy Award edition was released by Umbrella Entertainment.

See also
 List of submissions to the 63rd Academy Awards for Best Foreign Language Film
 List of French submissions for the Academy Award for Best Foreign Language Film

Notes

References

External links
 
 
 

1990 films
1990s French-language films
Best Film César Award winners
Films based on Cyrano de Bergerac (play)
Films directed by Jean-Paul Rappeneau
Films featuring a Best Actor César Award-winning performance
Films featuring a Best Supporting Actor César Award-winning performance
Films set in France
Films set in the 1640s
Films set in the 1650s
Films set in the 17th century
Films shot in France
Films whose director won the Best Director César Award
Films that won the Best Costume Design Academy Award
Films with screenplays by Jean-Claude Carrière
Films with screenplays by Jean-Paul Rappeneau
Best Foreign Language Film Golden Globe winners
French swashbuckler films
Biographical films about writers
Films produced by Michel Seydoux
1990s French films
Toronto International Film Festival People's Choice Award winners